Arambagh Girls' High School is a high school in Arambag,  West Bengal, India. The Bengali-medium school also offers Sanskrit language as a subject option.

The school is affiliated to the West Bengal Board of Secondary Education.

See also
Education in India
List of schools in India
Education in West Bengal

References

External links 

High schools and secondary schools in West Bengal
Girls' schools in West Bengal
Schools in Hooghly district
Educational institutions in India with year of establishment missing